Karen Dolva is a Norwegian interaction designer and founder of No Isolation. She was named to the BBC's 100 Women in 2020. She previously studied computer science at the University of Oslo.

References  

Living people
BBC 100 Women
Norwegian business executives
University of Oslo alumni
Year of birth missing (living people)